The Selwyn by-election, a by-election in the New Zealand electorate of Selwyn – a predominantly rural district in the Canterbury Plains in New Zealand's South Island – took place on 13 August 1994. The previous sitting MP, Ruth Richardson, precipitated the poll by resigning from parliament. Richardson planned to retire from politics, having been removed as Minister of Finance the previous year.

Background
The by-election was significant, as National held on to the majority of the House of Representatives by only one seat (50 to 49). This meant the party would have lost its majority in the House if it failed to retain the seat, and it would have required the formation of a coalition or a confidence-and-supply agreement with another parliamentary party – probably New Zealand First or the Alliance – to maintain governance.

All "major" New Zealand political parties of the day contested the by-election. David Carter, the National Party candidate, won the seat, and therefore the distribution of seats in Parliament did not change . In second place, and only around four hundred votes behind Carter, came the Alliance's John Wright, in a result that surprised many commentators. National's traditional opponent, the Labour Party, placed a distant third. The fourth "major" candidate represented the New Zealand First party: Tim Shadbolt, then Mayor of Invercargill.

Results
The following table shows the official results as published by the Electoral Commission.

References

Selwyn 1994
Selwyn
Politics of Canterbury, New Zealand
August 1994 events in New Zealand